Carrie Tan Huimin (born 1982) is a Singaporean politician. A member of the governing People's Action Party (PAP), she has been the Member of Parliament (MP) representing the Nee Soon South division of Nee Soon GRC since 2020.

Prior to joining politics, Tan founded Daughters of Tomorrow (DOT), an organisation which enables livelihoods and financial self-sufficiency for underprivileged women in Singapore. She raises awareness about urban poverty in Singapore, and forges collaboration among private, public and non-profit sectors to enable social and economic mobility for vulnerable communities as part of her work with DOT.

Tan is a Young Southeast Asian Leaders Initiative fellow and her work in women's empowerment and advocacy for collaboration was mentioned by United States President Barack Obama at a press conference during Singapore Prime Minister Lee Hsien Loong's visit to the White House in August 2016.

Early life and education 
Tan was born to a taxi driver-turned-contractor father and a housewife and has a sister. She had graduated from Raffles Girls’ School and later Raffles Junior College. She majored in history at the National University of Singapore and holds a Master of Public Administration from the Lee Kuan Yew School of Public Policy.

Career 
Tan was a headhunter until 2012. After a volunteering trip to South India in 2007, she founded a social enterprise, Daughters of Tomorrow, which provided skills training for underprivileged women in India.

In 2014, Tan was featured in a CNA documentary, "A Singaporean Abroad", about her humanitarian work in India, training women from villages who were rescued from sex-trafficking in cottage industry skills.

In November 2015, Tan was selected to introduce United States President Barack Obama at a Town Hall meeting in Kuala Lumpur as part of the Young Southeast Asian Leaders Initiative. In May 2016, she was awarded Honoree for the Children, World Peace and Human Rights category in the Ten Outstanding Young Persons Award by Junior Chambers International in Singapore.

Daughters Of Tomorrow 
Tan founded Daughters of Tomorrow (DOT) in 2012. DOT matches low income women to job opportunities, advocates for their inclusion in government policies and provides job training programs for low income women.

DOT was awarded the Most Investment-worthy Social Enterprise by the Asian Centre for Social Entrepreneurship & Philanthropy (ACSEP) of the National University of Singapore in 2015.

Politics 
Tan was fielded in the 2020 general election to contest in Nee Soon Group Representation Constituency (GRC), replacing the outgoing Member of Parliament Lee Bee Wah, on the People's Action Party's ticket against the Progress Singapore Party. Her running mates were K. Shanmugam, Louis Ng, Faishal Ibrahim, and Derrick Goh. On 11 July 2020, Tan and team were declared to be elected to represent Nee Soon GRC in the 14th Parliament of Singapore, garnering 61.9% of the valid votes.

References

External links
 Carrie Tan on Parliament of Singapore

Living people
Singaporean women in politics
People's Action Party politicians
Raffles Junior College alumni
Raffles Girls' Secondary School alumni
1982 births
Members of the Parliament of Singapore